John Eyre (29 October 1859 — 24 November 1941) was an English first-class cricketer.

The son of Richard Eyre, he was born at Shaw House in Berkshire in October 1859. He was educated at Winchester College, before going up to Keble College, Oxford. He later changed college, transferring to Christ Church. Eyre later made a single appearance in first-class cricket for the Marylebone Cricket Club (MCC), captained by W. G. Grace, against Cambridge University at Lord's in 1887. Batting once in the match, he was dismissed for 9 runs by Francis Ford in the MCC first innings, with the MCC winning the match by 10 wickets. He married Lady Evelyn Alice Curzon in April 1896, the daughter of Richard Curzon-Howe, 3rd Earl Howe. Eyre died at his Cleveland Square home in Bayswater in November 1941.

References

External links

1859 births
1941 deaths
People from West Berkshire District
People educated at Winchester College
Alumni of Keble College, Oxford
Alumni of Christ Church, Oxford
English cricketers
Marylebone Cricket Club cricketers